Luciano De Genova (19 May 1931 – 10 November 2019) was an Italian weightlifter. He represented Italy at the 1956 and 1960 Summer Olympic Games, competing in the Lightweight (67.5 kg) category.

Career 
De Genova was born in Genoa. He first competed outside Italy in the 1955 European Weightlifting Championships, finishing runner-up to Russian Nikolay Kostylev. The next year, De Genova finished third with a total of 347.5 kg.

He took part in the Melbourne 1956 Summer Olympics where he finished in 16th place out of 18 athletes — his poor performance coming partly as a result of a muscle strain.

In 1958, De Genova participated in the European Weightlifting Championships and the World Weightlifting Championships, receiving a silver medal in both competitions.

Luciano earned a 13th-place finish at the Rome 1960 Summer Olympics, finishing with a total lift of 352.5 kg.

References 

1931 births
Italian male weightlifters
Weightlifters at the 1956 Summer Olympics
Weightlifters at the 1960 Summer Olympics
2019 deaths
Olympic weightlifters of Italy
Sportspeople from Genoa
European Weightlifting Championships medalists
World Weightlifting Championships medalists
20th-century Italian people
21st-century Italian people